The  , commonly abbreviated to Nippo, is a preserver and maintainer of the registries for the six native Japanese dog breeds: the Akita Inu, Hokkaido, Kai Ken, Kishu,  Shikoku, and Shiba Inu. Nippo also issues the Nippo Standard, which serves as a breed standard for the six native breeds.

History
Nippo was founded in 1928 by Dr. Hirokichi Saito, who served as the group's first president, and formally named in 1932. With the support of Nippo, the Akita Inu was designated as a national monument in 1931, and the Shiba Inu in 1936. Nippo was formally recognized by the Japanese government in 1937. Nippo's first national show was held in Tokyo on November 6, 1932.

The group celebrated its 60th anniversary in 1988, and in 1992 had roughly 16,000 members with annual registrations of 60,000 dogs. Nippo currently holds one national show in the fall, and regional shows each fall and spring.

See also
 Japan Kennel Club

References

External links
 Nippo Website

Dog breeds originating in Japan
Kennel clubs